The Moving Arts Film Journal is an online film magazine. It is based in Wichita, Kansas, United States. It is edited and published by Eric M. Armstrong, member of the Online Film Critics Society.

The Moving Arts Film Journal publishes lists of the best movies ever made. The most recent list, TMA's 100 Greatest Movies of All Time, received wide coverage.

The article Krull Weddings: The Awkward Teenage Years of Movie Marketing received wide attention.

Originally conceived as print only publication in 2004, the magazine later evolved into an online only daily by 2006 and has continued publication in that medium ever since.

See also
 Senses of Cinema
 Bright Lights Film Journal

References

External links
 

2004 establishments in Kansas
2006 disestablishments in Kansas
Film magazines published in the United States
Online magazines published in the United States
Defunct magazines published in the United States
Film review websites
Magazines established in 2004
Magazines disestablished in 2006
Magazines published in Kansas
Online magazines with defunct print editions
Mass media in Wichita, Kansas
American film review websites